Jeznabad or Jaznabad or Jazanabad may refer to:
 Jeznabad, Baharestan
 Jeznabad, Lay Siyah